The Dock Brief is a 1960 Australian TV play directed by Ray Menmuir and starring Reg Lye and Moray Powell. It was based on the play by John Mortimer.

Premise
The barrister Morgenall is given a brief to defend a bird seed seller, Fowle, accused of murdering his wife.

Cast
Reg Lye as Fowle
Moray Powell as Morgenhall

Production
The play was made in Sydney under the direction of Ray Menmuir. A radio version of the play had been performed in Australia the previous year.

Menmuir said "as first seen the characters are quite comical but as the play progresses we begin to laugh with them rather than at them."

Douglas Smith designed the set which consisted of two areas: the prison cell and the imaginary courtroom. Special effects were used to create a "courtroom of the imagination" for a later scene.

Reception
The Sydney Morning Herald called it "beautifully acted" praising Menmuir's "admirably deft and very imaginative production."

References

External links
The Dock Brief 1962 Australian TV version at IMDb

1960 television plays